A falcine sinus is a venous channel that lies within the falx cerebri connecting the vein of Galen and the posterior part of superior sagittal sinus. It is normally present during fetal development and involutes after birth. The presence of a falcine sinus has been associated with a vein of Galen malformation and other vascular anomalies. The persistence of a falcine sinus after the neonatal period was previously thought to be rare, but has recently been described to be present in up to 5% of all people.

References 

Anatomical variations
Neuroanatomy
Veins of the head and neck